The 2005 Moorilla Hobart International was a women's tennis tournament played on outdoor hard courts and which was part of the Tier V category of the 2005 WTA Tour. It was the 12th edition of the tournament and took place at the Hobart International Tennis Centre in Hobart, Australia from 10 January until 14 January 2005. Unseeded Zheng Jie won the singles title and earned $16,000 first-prize money.

Finals

Singles
 Zheng Jie defeated  Gisela Dulko, 6–2, 6–0
 It was Zheng's first singles title of her career.

Doubles
 Yan Zi /  Zheng Jie defeated  Anabel Medina Garrigues /  Dinara Safina 6–4, 7–5

References

External links
 ITF tournament edition details
 Tournament draws

 
Hobart International
Moorilla Hobart International
Moorilla Hobart International